Vikram Betaal Ki Rahasya Gatha (which is also known as Vikram-Betaal) is an Indian television epic series created by Peninsula Pictures, based on Baital Pachisi. The series has aired on &TV and digitally on ZEE5 platform, starring Aham Sharma and Aayam Mehta in lead roles.

Plot
The story is about the life of Vikramaditya, also affectionately known as Vikram, the legendary king of Ujjaini, India. It focuses on the personal life and adventures of the great king Vikramaditya along with the stories narrated by Betaal which are mostly mythological.

When Vikram couldn't answer the last question, he brought the Betaal to the palace and they together face Bhadrakaal and 32 putlis sent by him. Vikram gave Mukti to all the putlis and slew Bhadrakaal hence becoming the worthy heir of the singhasan Battisi.

Cast

Main
 Aham Sharma as King Vikramaditya (2018-2019)
 Makarand Deshpande / Aayam Mehta as Betaal (2018-2019)
Garima Parihar as Madansena (2019)
 Sooraj Thapar as Bhadrakaal (2018–2019)
 Ishita Ganguly as Rani Padmini (2018–2019)

Recurring
 Sonia Singh as Pingla (2018–2019)
 Kuldeep Singh as Bharmal (2018–2019)
 Romanch Mehta as Kalidas (2018–2019)
 Ram Awana as Senapati Viraat Sen (2018–2019)
 Amit Behl as Varahamihira (2018–2019)
 Sparsh Khanchandani as Preth Pari (2018)

Cameo
 Pratik Parihar as Pavan Dev (2019)
 Aaditya Bajpayee as Rajkumar Chandrakant (2018)
 Rohit Sharma as Rajkumar Sooryakant (2018)
 Pooja Banerjee as Rajkumari Sonprabha(2018)
 Zuber K. Khan as Raja Veerabhadra (2018)
 Saanvi Talwar as Iravati (2018)
 Arun Singh Rana as King Suryabhan (2018) / Rama (2019)
 Sareeka Dhillon as Sunanda (2018) / Parvati (2019)
 Mansi Sharma as Queen Bhanumati (2018)
 Manoj Kolhatkar as Acharya Rajyogi (2018)
 Tarakesh Chauhan as Senapati of Queen Bhanumati (2018)
 Divyanganaa Jain as Rajkumari Satakshi (2018) / Mahamaya 
 Shantanu Monga as Yogidutt (2018)
 Ali Merchant as Malkhan Singh (2018)
 Urvashi Sharma as Malkhan's Wife (2018)
 Sailesh Gulabani as Bhujang (2018)
 Aditi Asija as Prabhavati (2018)
 Arti Singh as Shachi / Draupadi (2018)
 Puneet Vashisht as Kaal Bhairav (2018) / Mahadev (2018 ; 2019)
 Preet Kaur Madhan as Renuka / Sudeha (2018)
 Yash Gera as Naagraj (2018)
 Sharhaan Singh as Bhagyadev (2018)
 Dalljiet Kaur as Anasuya (2018)
 Punit Talreja as Rishi Atri (2018)
 Abhishek Gupta as Ram (2018)
 Charu Mehra as Sita (2018)
 Dinesh Mehta as Ravan (2018)
 Brownie Parashar as Vashishtha (2018)
 Ravneet Kaur as Sita (2019)
 Dheeraj Miglani as Narada (2018) 
 Riyanka Chanda as Parvati (2018)
 Ravish Desai as Krishna (2019) / Vishnu (2019)
 Shagun Sharma as Rukmini (2019) / Kashi (2019)
 Kapil Arya as Indra (2018 ; 2019) / Arjuna (2019)
 Keertida Mistry as Chitrāngadā (2019)
 Monica Sharma as Uloopi (2019)
 Rohit Chandel as Babruvahana (2019)
 Shakti Singh as Yudishtira (2019)
 Garima Jain as Lopamudra / Raktmanjari (2019)
 Simran Kaur as Parvati (2019)
 Arunim G Mishra as Karthikeya (2019)
 Mona Vasu as Chudail (2019)
 Rudra Soni as Ekalavya (2019)
 Sudhir Nema as Drona (2019)
 Ravi Gossain as Vashishta (2019)
 Siddharth Vasudev as Vishwamitra (2019)
 Hans Dev Sharma as Raja Janak(2019)
 Arishfa Khan as Mohana (2019)
 Shivya Pathania as Lakshmi (2019)
 Coral Bhamra as Adishakti (2019)
 Shafaq Naaz as Ahalya (2019)
 Rajeev Bharadwaj as Gautama Maharishi (2019)
 Siddharth Dubey as Hanuman (2019)
 Dolphin Dwivedi as Anjani (2019)
 Pooja Kanwal as Narmada (2019)
 Sikandar Kharbanda as Kameshwar (2019)
 Himani Sharma as Swapnasundari (2019)
 Charu Asopa as Nayantara (2019)
 Antara Banerjee as Kapalika(2019)
 Vindhya Tiwari as Kalika / Jogni (2019)
 Prerna Sharma as Kamodini (2019)
 Aanchal Khurana as Sugandha (2019)
 Viren Singh as King Somdev (2019)
 Patrali Chattopadhyay as Putli (2019)

Production
Television actor Aham Sharma, known for his work in the television shows Mahabharat and Brahmarakshas, got finalized to portray King Vikramaditya, the main protagonist. Meanwhile, actor Makarand Deshpande, known for his work in films, got selected for the role of Betaal. Television actor Sooraj Thapar got selected to play Bhadrasaal, the Main Antagonist.

Television actress
Chhavi Pandey, known for her work in the shows Ek Boond Ishq and Kaal Bhairav Rahasya, was selected for the role of Rani Padmini, the wife of Vikram, but Pandey got the lead role in the television show Ladies Special 2. So, the role of Rani Padmini was offered to actress Ishita Ganguly of Shastri Sisters fame, and Ganguly got finalized for the role.

Other actors including Sonia Singh, Romanch Mehta, Sparsh Khanchandani, Kuldeep Singh, Amit Behl & Ram Awana were also seen in the show. Meanwhile, when the show started, the show introduced many cameo appearances of many actors. In January 2019, the show marked the entry of television actress Garima Parihar, who was seen in the shows Mere Angne Mein and Rishta Likhenge Hum Naya, as Madansena, Vikram's former love interest.

In the same month (January), Makarand Deshpande, who was playing Betaal, quit the show. So, Bollywood and television star Aayam Mehta, who was doing the show Kaal Bhairav Rahasya 2, replaced Deshpande and now plays the role of Betaal.

See also
 Vikram aur Betaal (1988 TV Series)

References

External links
 
 Live Episodes

Hindi-language television shows
2018 Indian television series debuts
Memorials to Vikramaditya
Ghosts in television
&TV original programming
Indian epic television series
Television shows based on fairy tales
Indian fantasy television series
Vampires in television